The Battle of Dhi Qar, also known as the War of the Camel's Udder, was a pre-Islamic battle fought between Arab tribes and the Sassanid Empire in Southern Iraq. The battle occurred after the death of Al-Nu'man III by the orders of Khosru II.

The dating of the event is disputed. The Encyclopedia Iranica entry on the subject says:

The battle of Dhū-Qār is reported in many classical works of Arabic history and literature. The longest, but not necessarily most representative, version is Bishr ibn Marwān al-Asadī's Ḥarb Banī Shaybān maʻa Kisrá Ānūshirwān.

See also
 Fijar Wars
 Al-Nu'man III

References

Sources

Dhi Qar
7th century in Iran
Dhi Qar
Dhi Qar
609